The 1959 New Mexico Lobos football team represented the University of New Mexico in the Skyline Conference during the 1959 NCAA University Division football season.  In their second and final season under head coach Marv Levy, the Lobos compiled a 7–3 record (4–2 against Skyline opponents), finished third in the conference, and outscored all opponents by a total of 260 to 135.

The team's statistical leaders included George Friberg with 361 passing yards and Don Perkins with 636 rushing yards, 226 receiving yards and 66 points scored. Perkins went on to play eight seasons for the Dallas Cowboys and played in six Pro Bowls.

In February 1960, New Mexico head coach Marv Levy was hired as the head football coach at the University of California. Levy compiled a 14–6 record in two seasons at New Mexico.

Schedule

References

New Mexico
New Mexico Lobos football seasons
New Mexico Lobos football